Phosphoramidates (sometimes also called amidophosphates) are a class of phosphorus compounds structurally related to phosphates (or organophosphates) via the substitution of an OR for a NR2. They are derivatives of phosphoramidic acids O=P(OH)(NR2)2, O=P(OH)2(NR2). 

A phosphorodiamidate (or diamidophosphate) is a phosphate that has two of its OH groups substituted by NR2 groups to give a species with the general formula O=P(OH)(NH2)2.
The substitution of all three OH groups gives the phosphoric triamides (O=P(NR2)3), which are commonly referred to as phosphoramides.

Examples
Two examples of natural phosphoramidates are phosphocreatine and the phosphoramidate formed when histidine residues in histidine kinases are phosphorylated.
An example of a phosphorodiamidate is morpholino which is used in molecular biology.

See also
Phosphoramidite

References

 
Functional groups